Paul Stagg Coakley (born June 3, 1955) is an American prelate of the Roman Catholic Church. He has been serving as archbishop of the Archdiocese of Oklahoma City since 2010

Early life and education
Paul Coakley was born on June 3, 1955, in Norfolk, Virginia, to John and Mary Coakley. His mother was of French descent and his father of Irish descent. The second of three children, he has an older brother, John, and a younger sister, Mary Christina. At age 2, he and his family moved to Metairie, Louisiana, where Coakley attended St. Mary Magdalen School from 1960 to 1965.

The family then moved to Overland Park, Kansas in 1965, and Coakley there attended Cherokee Elementary School for two years. He attended Broadmoor Junior High School (1967–1970) and Shawnee Mission West High School in Overland (1970–1973).  Coakley ten entered the University of Kansas (KU) in Lawrence, Kansas, obtaining a Bachelor of Arts degree in English and Classical Antiquities in  1977. During this period, he was also a student in KU's Integrated Humanities Program. After graduating from KU, Coakley traveled in Europe and briefly considered a monastic vocation at the Abbey of Notre Dame de Fontgombault in France. He then returned to the United States, where he entered St. Pius X Seminary in Erlanger, Kentucky in 1978.

On April 8, 1982, he was ordained a deacon by Bishop David M. Maloney. He also studied at Mount St. Mary's Seminary in Emmitsburg, Maryland, earning a Master's in Divinity in 1983.

Priesthood
Coakley was ordained a priest for the Diocese of Wichita by Eugene J. Gerber on May 21, 1983. He then served as chaplain at St. Francis Regional Medical Center in Wichita from June to August 1983, and as associate pastor at St. Mary's Parish in Derby, Kansas, from 1983 to 1985. Coakley then furthered his studies in Rome at the Pontifical Gregorian University, where he received a Licentiate of Sacred Theology in 1987.

Upon his return to Wichita, Coakley served as chaplain at Kansas Newman College in Wichita from 1987 to 1989. He also worked as director of the Office of Youth and Young Adult Ministries (1987–91), and pastor of Our Lady of Guadalupe Church (1989–90). From 1990 to 1995, he served as associate director of the Spiritual Life Center and associate pastor of St. Thomas Aquinas Parish. Coakley served as pastor of the Church of the Resurrection Parish from 1995 to 1998 before returning to Mount St. Mary's Seminary in Maryland, where he was director of spiritual formation from 1998 to 2002.

Coakley served as director of the Spiritual Life Center in Wichita from 2002 to January 2004, when he became vice-chancellor of the diocese. He also served as administrator of the Church of the Magdalen Parish from July to December 2004.

Bishop of Salina

On October 21, 2004, Coakley was appointed the ninth bishop of the Diocese of Salina by Pope John Paul II. He was consecrated on December 28, 2004, by Archbishop James P. Keleher, with Bishops George K. Fitzsimons and Eugene J. Gerber serving as co-consecrators. He selected as his episcopal motto: Duc In Altum, meaning, "Put Out Into The Deep".

During the 2008 US presidential election, Coakley declared, "To vote for a candidate who supports an intrinsic evil, such as abortion or genocide, would require a proportionately grave moral reason for ignoring such a flaw."He later stated that House Speaker Nancy Pelosi and Senator Joe Biden "misrepresented Catholic teaching on abortion" in their respective interviews on Meet the Press.  Later calling the victory of President Barack Obama an "undeniable irony," he said that the election of the first African-American president "signals that our nation has crossed a threshold in the struggle for civil rights" but also noted Obama's "denial of civil rights and legal protection to a whole class of persons as well, unborn human beings."

In March 2009, Coakley described President Obama's reversal of the Mexico City Policy and nomination of Governor Kathleen Sebelius as Secretary of Health and Human Services as "serious assaults against the rights of conscience and our efforts to protect innocent human life."

Within the United States Conference of Catholic Bishops (USCCB), Coakley currently sits on the Subcommittee on Home Missions; Committee on Clergy, Consecrated Life and Vocations; and Committee on Evangelization and Catechesis. He is also a Fourth Degree Knight of Columbus, and a member of the Equestrian Order of the Holy Sepulchre of Jerusalem.

Archbishop of Oklahoma City
On December 16, 2010, Pope Benedict XVI appointed Coakley as archbishop of the Archdiocese of Oklahoma City.  He was installed on February 11, 2011, replacing retiring Eusebius J. Beltran.  After the announcement, Coakley remarked: "This new pastoral responsibility is an opportunity and a challenge that I certainly had not sought, but one which I will eagerly embrace with all my heart."In August 2014, Coakley criticized the Oklahoma City municipal government for allowing a Satanist gathering at the Civic Center Music Hall, saying,"If someone had come to them to rent the Civic Center to stage a burning of the Koran or to hold an event that was blatantly and clearly anti-Semitic, I think they might find a way to prevent it ... Not all speech is protected if there is hate speech and it is intended to ridicule another religion ... I don't believe it is a free speech matter."On August 25, 2018, Archbishop Carlo Maria Viganò, former apostolic nuncio to the United States, released an 11-page letter describing a series of warnings to the Vatican regarding sexual misconduct by Cardinal Theodore McCarrick, who had been removed from active ministry on June 20, 2018, following allegations deemed credible of sexually abusing a minor.  McCarric was later forced to resign from the cardinalate. According to Viganò, Benedict XVI had placed secret restrictions on McCarrick in 2009 or 2010, but Pope Francis removed these sanctions and made McCarrick "his trusted counselor." The end of the letter called on Francis and all those responsible for the coverup to resign. 

The Viganò letter provoked diverse reactions. It was said to read "in part like a homophobic attack on Francis" filled with "unsubstantiated allegations and personal attacks," with many speculating that Viganò's conservative views, among other things, led him into a "declaration of war" against Francis. A number of bishops sharply criticized the letter, while others called for an investigation. Coakley professed to having "the deepest respect for Archbishop Viganó and his personal integrity" and called for an investigation and a "purification" of the Church.

Catholic Relief Services
On November 18, 2013, at the USCCB General Assembly, Coakley was announced as the new chair of the board of Catholic Relief Services (CRS), succeeding Bishop Gerald Kicanas.  The international relief and humanitarian agency of the US Catholic Church, CRS operates in about 91 companies, and the board stewards a budget of over $700 million. Coakley had been on the board since 2012, and at the time of his appointment, the agency was in the midst of responding to the impact of Typhoon Haiyan in the Philippines. Coakley described himself as "humbled" and "honored" to chair the 70-year-old organization.

In his first months as chair, Archbishop Coakley undertook visits to Palestine and the Philippines to observe the agency's programs and meet with local staff and beneficiaries.

See also

 Catholic Church hierarchy
 Catholic Church in the United States
 Historical list of the Catholic bishops of the United States
 List of Catholic bishops of the United States
 Lists of patriarchs, archbishops, and bishops

References

External links

Roman Catholic Archdiocese of Oklahoma City's Official Site
Roman Catholic Archbishop of Oklahoma City's Official Site

Episcopal succession

1955 births
Living people
Mount St. Mary's University alumni
Pontifical North American College alumni
Pontifical Gregorian University alumni
University of Kansas alumni
American people of French descent
American people of Irish descent
Catholics from Virginia
Catholics from Kansas
People from Norfolk, Virginia
Roman Catholic Diocese of Wichita
Roman Catholic archbishops of Oklahoma City
Roman Catholic bishops of Salina
21st-century Roman Catholic archbishops in the United States
Members of the Order of the Holy Sepulchre